

Champions

Major League Baseball
World Series: Oakland Athletics over San Francisco Giants (4–0); Dave Stewart, MVP

American League Championship Series MVP: Rickey Henderson
National League Championship Series MVP: Will Clark
All-Star Game, July 11 at Anaheim Stadium: American League, 5–3; Bo Jackson, MVP

Other champions
Caribbean World Series: Águilas del Zulia (Venezuela)
College World Series: Wichita State
Japan Series: Yomiuri Giants over Kintetsu Buffaloes (4–3)
Korean Series: Haitai Tigers over Binggrae Eagles
Big League World Series: Taipei, Taiwan
Junior League World Series: Manatí, Puerto Rico
Little League World Series: Trumbull National, Trumbull, Connecticut
Senior League World Series: Pingtung, Taiwan

Awards and honors
Baseball Hall of Fame
Al Barlick
Johnny Bench
Red Schoendienst
Carl Yastrzemski
Most Valuable Player
Robin Yount, Milwaukee Brewers (AL)
Kevin Mitchell, San Francisco Giants (NL)
Cy Young Award
Bret Saberhagen, Kansas City Royals (AL)
Mark Davis, San Diego Padres (NL)
Rookie of the Year
Gregg Olson, Baltimore Orioles (AL)
Jerome Walton, Chicago Cubs (NL)
Manager of the Year Award
Frank Robinson, Baltimore Orioles (AL)
Don Zimmer, Chicago Cubs (NL)
Woman Executive of the Year (major or minor league): Pat Hamilton, Toledo Mud Hens, International League
Gold Glove Award
Don Mattingly (1B) (AL)
Harold Reynolds (2B) (AL)
Gary Gaetti (3B) (AL)
Tony Fernández (SS) (AL)
Gary Pettis (OF) (AL)
Kirby Puckett (OF) (AL)
Devon White (OF) (AL)
Bob Boone (C) (AL)
Bret Saberhagen (P) (AL)
Andrés Galarraga (1B) (NL)
Ryne Sandberg (2B) (NL)
Terry Pendleton (3B) (NL)
Ozzie Smith (SS) (NL)
Eric Davis (OF) (NL)
Tony Gwynn (OF) (NL)
Andy Van Slyke (OF) (NL)
Benito Santiago (OF) (NL)
Ron Darling (OF) (NL)

MLB statistical leaders

Major League Baseball final standings

Events

January
January 9 – Johnny Bench and Carl Yastrzemski are elected to the Hall of Fame by the Baseball Writers' Association of America in their first year of eligibility. Bench was named on 96.4 percent of the ballots, the third-highest figure in history behind Ty Cobb and Hank Aaron.

February
February 28 – Red Schoendienst, a former second baseman and manager of the St. Louis Cardinals, and Al Barlick, a National League umpire for 28 seasons, are elected to the Hall of Fame by the Special Veterans Committee.

March

April
April 29 – In the first Saturday night game at Wrigley Field, the San Diego Padres and the Chicago Cubs combine to make 11 errors: 6 by the Padres, 5 by the Cubs. San Diego wins 5–4.

May
May 7 – Chicago mayor Richard M. Daley presides over the groundbreaking of the new Comiskey Park.
May 28 – George Bell ends the Toronto Blue Jays' twelve-year stay at Exhibition Stadium with a walk-off home run to win the Jays' final game there with a 7–5 win over the Chicago White Sox, the same team the Jays' faced in their first game at Exhibition Stadium and in franchise history twelve years earlier.
May 29 – Mike Schmidt of the Philadelphia Phillies calls a press conference, and tearfully announces his retirement, effective immediately. Nonetheless, he will be voted to start the All-Star Game, and is permitted to appear in uniform.

June
June 5 – Just eight days after leaving Exhibition Stadium, the Toronto Blue Jays open their new home; SkyDome (now known as Rogers Centre);  the first stadium in Major League history with a functioning retractable roof.  As he did in the last game at Exhibition Stadium, George Bell hits a home run.
June 8 – At Veterans Stadium, the visiting Pittsburgh Pirates score 10 runs in the top of the first inning against the Philadelphia Phillies, three of which come on a Barry Bonds home run. As the Phillies come to bat in the bottom of the first, Pirates broadcaster Jim Rooker says on the air, "If we lose this game, I'll walk home." Both Von Hayes and Steve Jeltz hit two home runs (the latter would only hit five during his Major League career; he also becomes the first Phillie to homer from both sides of the plate in the same game) to trigger a comeback for the Phillies, who finally tie the game in the 8th on a wild pitch, then take the lead on Darren Daulton's two-run single and go on to win 15–11, becoming the first team to win a game after giving up 10 runs in the first inning. After the season, Rooker conducts a 300-plus-mile charity walk from Philadelphia to Pittsburgh.

July
July 4 – Against the Philadelphia Phillies at Veterans Stadium, Cincinnati Reds pitcher Tom Browning, having already pitched a perfect game a year earlier, misses becoming the first pitcher in Major League history to throw two perfect games. Dickie Thon's leadoff double in the ninth breaks up this bid; Thon later scores on a Steve Jeltz single. John Franco then relieves Browning and induces Lenny Dykstra to hit into a game-ending double play for a Reds 2–1 victory.
July 5:
Mark McGwire hits his 100th career home run.
Cincinnati Reds outfielder Paul O'Neill kicks a ball to the infield to prevent Steve Jeltz of the Philadelphia Phillies from scoring the game winning run. Moments later Jeltz scores the winning run on a wild pitch as the Phillies defeat the Reds 3-2.
July 11 – At Anaheim Stadium, Bo Jackson and Wade Boggs lead off the bottom of the first inning with back-to-back home runs off Rick Reuschel to spark the American League to a 5–3 win over the National League in the All-Star Game. Jackson earns MVP honors.
July 13:
A game between the Montreal Expos and Los Angeles Dodgers at Olympic Stadium is rained out because the roof, ripped by 62 mile per hour winds on June 27, cannot be lowered from its retracted position. Zamboni machines were used in an attempt to remove the water.
After missing just over half the season with a broken wrist, Jose Canseco returns to the Oakland A's lineup, homers, and drives in three runs in his first game back, an 11–7 win over the Toronto Blue Jays.
July 16 – California Angels manager Doug Rader is ejected before the game against the Baltimore Orioles while taking the lineup card to home plate for arguing Mike Devereaux's disputed game-ending home run (fair vs. foul) from the night before.
July 29 – At Olympic Stadium, Vince Coleman of the St. Louis Cardinals is called out twice for interference on the base paths.

August
August 3 – The Cincinnati Reds score 14 first inning runs in an 18–2 rout of the Houston Astros, just missing the major league record of 15, which ironically was set against the Reds by the Brooklyn Dodgers in 1952.
August 4 – Dave Stieb, pitching for the Toronto Blue Jays, loses a perfect game with two outs in the ninth inning when Roberto Kelly doubles, and later scores.  Stieb wins a 2–1 two-hitter, but it is the third no-hitter that he has lost in the ninth inning in the past 11 months.
August 10:
A little over 10 months removed from surgery to remove a cancerous tumor from his pitching arm, Dave Dravecky of the San Francisco Giants starts and beats the Cincinnati Reds 4–3, pitching eight innings.
For the fifth time in his career, five-time no-hit pitcher Nolan Ryan has a no-hitter broken up in the ninth. His Texas Rangers leading the Detroit Tigers 4–0 at Arlington Stadium, Ryan has the bid broken up by a Dave Bergman single with one out. After Matt Nokes doubles home Bergman, Ryan is relieved by Jeff Russell, who retires the two batters he faces, striking out Doug Strange for the final out.
August 15 – After his miraculous comeback game against the Reds, Dave Dravecky starts against the Montreal Expos and, in the sixth inning, the humerus bone in his pitching arm snaps, ending his season.  While celebrating the Giants' clinching the NL West division title, Dravecky would break the arm once again.  Doctors would later discover that the cancer in his arm had returned.  Eighteen days later, Dravecky would retire from baseball.
August 17 – Bruce Hurst of the San Diego Padres becomes the first pitcher in Major League history to defeat both reigning Cy Young Award winners in the same season. In the Padres' 6–2 victory over the New York Mets at Shea Stadium, he bests Frank Viola, who had been traded from the Minnesota Twins after winning the American League Cy Young Award. On July 28, Hurst had defeated the Los Angeles Dodgers and National League Cy Young winner Orel Hershiser 2–1 at Jack Murphy Stadium.
August 21 – Cal Ripken hits his 200th career home run, helping the Baltimore Orioles beat the Milwaukee Brewers 5–0.
August 23 – The Los Angeles Dodgers edge the Montreal Expos 1–0 in 22 innings, the longest game in Expos franchise history. During the game, Expos mascot Youppi! is ejected by umpire Bob Davidson after manager Tommy Lasorda complains that the furry creature is pounding on the top of the dugout. Rick Dempsey hit a solo home run off of Dennis Martínez for the game's winning and only run.
August 24 – Commissioner A. Bartlett Giamatti announces in a press conference that Pete Rose is banned from baseball for life, in the wake of evidence that has come to light regarding Rose's alleged gambling history.

September
September 1 – Commissioner A. Bartlett Giamatti unexpectedly dies of a heart attack.
September 13 – Fay Vincent is officially named the new Commissioner of Baseball following the death of A. Bartlett Giamatti.
September 14 – Jeff Reardon of the Minnesota Twins earns his 30th save of the season in a 2–0 win over the Toronto Blue Jays.  He becomes the first pitcher to save 30 games in five consecutive seasons.
September 26 - At Olympic Stadium in Montreal, the Boys of Zimmer reached its peak as the Chicago Cubs beat the Montreal Expos 3-2 to win their second National League East title in the 1980s.
September 30 – NBC broadcasts its final Major League Baseball Game of the Week (before the program is transferred to CBS). NBC had broadcast the Game of the Week since 1957 and exclusively since 1966. Bob Costas and Tony Kubek called the action from Toronto's SkyDome, as the Toronto Blue Jays defeated the Baltimore Orioles to clinch the American League Eastern Division title.

October
October 3 – Kirby Puckett wins an unlikely, at the time, batting title taking advantage of an off year by Wade Boggs due to marital issues. Puckett would clinch the title in Seattle on a double in the final game of the season.
October 9 – After 43 years on the air, NBC concludes its run (coinciding with the San Francisco Giants defeating the Chicago Cubs in Game 5 of the National League Championship Series to insure their first trip to the World Series since 1962) as the number one over-the-air network television broadcaster for Major League Baseball games.
October 17 – Game 3 of the World Series is postponed due to the Loma Prieta earthquake, which struck immediately before the game was set to begin. It would be rescheduled for ten days later, October 27.
October 28 – The Oakland Athletics complete a four-game sweep of the San Francisco Giants in the 1989 World Series. It's the first WS sweep since 1976. Oakland pitcher Dave Stewart, who won two games, is named MVP.  It is also the latest in the calendar year that a World Series game has ever been played up to this point. This was also ABC's final Major League Baseball telecast until July 1994, when The Baseball Network was launched. ABC, who had broadcast Major League Baseball games since 1976 was like NBC was about to lose the television rights to CBS.

November
November 1 - Frank Robinson who led the Baltimore Orioles to a near American League East Title was named American League Manager of the Year by the Baseball Writers Association of America. He received 23 of 28 first place votes.
November 20 – Milwaukee Brewers outfielder Robin Yount wins his second American League MVP Award.  With his  Award coming in a year he played shortstop, he is the second player (Hank Greenberg) to win two such awards while playing different positions.
November 21 - Kevin Mitchell who batted .291 and scored 100 runs and led the San Francisco Giants to their first World Series appearance since 1962 was named the National League MVP. Mitchell received 20 of the 24 first-place votes.
November 22 – Free agent outfielder Kirby Puckett re-signs with the Minnesota Twins for $9 million over three years, making him the first ML player ever to sign a contract that calls for an average salary of $3 million per year.

December
December 5 – The Mets traded reliever Randy Myers to the Reds for fellow closer John Franco and on the same day Cleveland traded Joe Carter to San Diego for Chris James, Sandy Alomar and Carlos Baerga and free agent closer Jeff Reardon to the Boston Red Sox.
December 25 – Five-time New York Yankees manager and former second baseman Billy Martin is killed in a pickup truck accident near his home in upstate New York. Martin was 61.

Movies
Major League
Field of Dreams

Births

January
January 1 – Jarrett Parker
January 4 – Kevin Pillar 
January 5 – Eduardo Escobar
January 7 – Phillippe Aumont
January 10 – Ariel Miranda
January 11 – Rico Noel
January 13 – Heath Hembree
January 14 – Adam Kolarek
January 17 – Darío Álvarez
January 17 – Blake Beavan
January 17 – Taylor Jordan
January 18 – Michael Pineda
January 19 – James Beresford
January 20 – Travis Taijeron
January 23 – Robert Carson
January 24 – Whit Merrifield
January 24 – José Quintana
January 26 – Branden Pinder
January 30 – Keith Butler
January 31 – Tommy La Stella

February
February 2 – Logan Darnell
February 2 – Shuhei Fukuda
February 6 – Matt Duffy
February 6 – Donald Lutz
February 9 – Danny Muno
February 9 – Jake Smolinski
February 10 – Travis d'Arnaud
February 10 – Dayán Díaz
February 10 – Liam Hendriks
February 11 – César Cabral
February 14 – Juan Graterol
February 14 – Derek Norris
February 15 – Mark Canha
February 16 – John Gast 
February 16 – Eduardo Sánchez
February 19 – Fabio Castillo
February 22 – Chris Bassitt
February 23 – Wilin Rosario
February 24 – Miguel Rojas
February 28 – Chad Bell
February 28 – Neftalí Soto

March
March 4 – Rubby De La Rosa
March 5 – Mauricio Robles
March 10 – Tyler Holt
March 10 – Dayán Viciedo
March 12 – Taylor Hill
March 13 – Sandy León
March 14 – Marwin González
March 15 – Keith Hessler
March 16 – Michael Blazek
March 16 – Andrew Triggs
March 17 – Juan Lagares
March 18 – David Freitas
March 20 – Todd Cunningham
March 27 – Ryne Harper
March 27 – Matt Harvey
March 30 – Chris Sale
March 31 – Alfredo Marte
March 31 – Josmil Pinto

April
April 1 – Chris Withrow
April 2 – Rob Rasmussen
April 6 – Alexi Amarista
April 7 – Kevin Shackelford
April 8 – Lendy Castillo
April 10 – Charlie Culberson
April 11 – José Cisnero
April 11 – Yoshihiro Maru
April 12 – Pedro Hernández
April 12 – Raudel Lazo
April 15 – Adeiny Hechavarria
April 17 – Deolis Guerra
April 21 – Josh Rutledge
April 24 – Steven Souza
April 26 – Chad Bettis
April 30 – Phil Klein

May
May 1 – Maikel Cleto
May 4 – Nick Noonan
May 6 – José Alvarez
May 8 – Steven Kent
May 8 – Wily Peralta
May 11 – David Buchanan
May 12 – Bradin Hagens
May 14 – Christian Colón
May 17 – John Cornely
May 17 – Jordan Jankowski
May 18 – Jared Hoying
May 20 – Ariel Peña
May 22 – Drake Britton
May 22 – Corey Dickerson
May 24 – Aaron Wilkerson
May 25 – Pat Dean
May 25 – Neil Ramirez
May 31 – Edgar Ibarra

June
June 3 – Nefi Ogando
June 5 – Jimmy Nelson
June 5 – Layne Somsen
June 6 – Ethan Martin
June 7 – Dean Kiekhefer
June 7 – Seiji Kobayashi
June 8 – T. J. McFarland
June 9 – Joel De La Cruz
June 10 – Zoilo Almonte
June 12 – Dallas Beeler
June 13 – Drew Smyly
June 14 – Héctor Neris
June 14 – Chase Whitley
June 18 – Matt Moore
June 22 – Ryan Searle
June 23 – Deck McGuire
June 24 – Robbie Ross
June 27 – Abraham Almonte
June 27 – A. J. Schugel
June 28 – Jason Krizan

July
July 1 – Mike Montgomery
July 1 – Brett Oberholtzer
July 4 – Jabari Blash
July 5 – Tony Cingrani
July 10 – Scott Alexander
July 10 – Will Smith
July 13 – Tyler Cravy
July 14 – Rob Brantly
July 18 – Derek Dietrich
July 19 – Luis Avilán
July 19 – Patrick Corbin
July 20 – Mike Marjama
July 20 – Tyler Saladino
July 20 – Steve Selsky
July 20 – Kevin Siegrist
July 20 – Matt Szczur
July 23 – Stephen Pryor
July 29 – Eric Jokisch
July 30 – Jesse Hahn
July 30 – Matt Skole

August
August 1 – Madison Bumgarner
August 1 – Nick Ramirez
August 2 – Onelki Garcia
August 3 – Roberto Goméz
August 5 – Chasen Bradford
August 5 – Guido Knudson
August 7 – Tommy Kahnle
August 7 – Brock Stassi
August 8 – Greg Garcia
August 8 – Anthony Rizzo
August 9 – Dustin Antolin
August 9 – Jason Heyward
August 12 – Kyle Lobstein
August 18 – Daichi Suzuki
August 18 – Daniel Webb
August 20 – Taylor Cole
August 21 – Ehire Adrianza
August 21 – Tim Collins
August 21 – Elliot Soto
August 27 – Josh Vitters
August 28 – Matt Andriese
August 28 – Matt Dominguez
August 29 – Robby Scott
August 29 – Brent Suter
August 29 – Logan Watkins
August 30 – Billy Burns
August 30 – D. J. Johnson
August 31 – John Hicks
August 31 – Austin Pruitt

September
September 4 – Cody Martin
September 4 – Andrelton Simmons
September 5 – Nick Maronde
September 5 – Zach Walters
September 9 – Anthony Ranaudo
September 11 – Zeke Spruill
September 11 – Nik Turley
September 12 – Freddie Freeman
September 14 – Francisco Arcia
September 16 – Robbie Grossman
September 17 – Yuhei Nakaushiro
September 18 – Taylor Motter
September 19 – George Springer
September 20 – Scott Snodgress
September 23 – Trevor May 
September 24 – Jake Buchanan
September 24 – Matt Ramsey
September 25 – Tyler Wilson
September 26 – Colin Walsh
September 27 – Mike Miller
September 29 – T. J. House
September 30 – Kyle Parker

October
October 2 – Ryan Dull
October 2 – Aaron Hicks
October 2 – Tyler Olson
October 2 – Chad Smith
October 4 – Casey Kelly
October 6 - Josh Tols
October 8 – Taylor Featherston
October 8 – Albert Suárez
October 9 – Tim Melville
October 10 – Jeurys Familia
October 10 – Isaac Galloway
October 11 – Jenrry Mejía
October 11 – Josh Smith
October 11 – Tomoyuki Sugano
October 12 – Francisco Peña
October 15 – Huascar Brazobán
October 17 – Chris Mazza
October 18 – Carson Blair
October 18 – Brad Miller
October 19 – Cory Mazzoni
October 19 – Carson Smith
October 21 – Danny Barnes
October 24 – Eric Hosmer
October 26 – Wilfredo Boscán
October 26 – Daniel Coulombe
October 27 – Rubén Tejada
October 31 – Scott McGough

November
November 1 – Engel Beltré 
November 5 – Ramón Cabrera
November 7 – Tim Atherton
November 7 – Sonny Gray
November 8 – Giancarlo Stanton
November 10 – Michael Choice
November 10 – Matt Magill 
November 12 – Adrián Nieto
November 13 – Lane Adams
November 13 – Carlos Frías
November 14 – Freddy Galvis
November 16 – Juan Centeno
November 17 – Seth Lugo
November 17 – Héctor Sánchez
November 19 – Michael Tonkin
November 21 – José Pirela
November 21 – Robert Stock
November 23 – Shinya Kayama
November 23 – Ross Stripling
November 28 – Taylor Davis
November 28 – Danny Hultzen
November 28 – Jesús Montero
November 28 – Ángel Sánchez
November 30 – Mikie Mahtook

December
December 5 – Ryan Garton
December 7 – Kyle Hendricks
December 13 – Tyler Pastornicky
December 14 – Donn Roach
December 16 – Tyler Chatwood
December 18 – Taylor Jungmann
December 19 – Ian Parmley
December 19 – James Ramsey
December 21 – David Rollins
December 22 – Patrick Kivlehan
December 22 – Rey Navarro
December 22 – Noe Ramirez
December 22 – Jacob Stallings
December 26 – Sean Nolin
December 28 – Austin Barnes
December 28 – Austin Nola
December 30 – Tyler Anderson
December 30 – Erik Johnson
December 31 – Kelvin Herrera

Deaths

January
January 9 – Bill Terry, 90, Hall of Fame first baseman for the New York Giants from 1923 to 1936 and a .341 career hitter, who was the last National League player to hit .400 (.401 in 1930); succeeded legendary John McGraw as manager on June 4, 1932, and led Giants to 1933 World Series title, NL pennants in 1936 and 1937, and an 822–661 (.554) overall record through 1941.
January 12 – Clise Dudley, 85, pitcher who posted a 17–33 record for the Brooklyn, Philadelphia and Chicago National League teams from 1929 to 1933.
January 13 – Pat Ankenman, 76, backup second baseman who played for the 1936 St. Louis Cardinals and the Brooklyn Dodgers in 1943 and 1944.
January 13 – Ray Morehart, 89, backup infielder for the Chicago White Sox in 1924 and 1926, also a member of the "Murderers' Row" 1927 New York Yankees.
January 16 – Frank Trechock, 73, shortstop for the 1937 Washington Senators; in lone MLB game on September 19, he went two-for-four (.500).
January 18 – Buster Clarkson, 72, batted .308 in major-league career that included five seasons in the Negro leagues (1938–1940, 1942, 1945) and 14 games as a utility infielder for the 1952 Boston Braves.
January 18 – Jim Odom, 67, American League umpire, 1965 to 1974; also worked the 1968 MLB All-Star Game and the 1971 World Series.
January 21 – Carl Furillo, 66, All-Star right fielder who played from 1946 through 1960 for the Brooklyn/Los Angeles Dodgers, who hit over .300 five times and over .290 five other times, winning the National League batting crown in 1953,  and owner of a strong arm  in the outfield that earned him the name The Reading Rifle.
January 23 – George Case, 73, four-time All-Star and corner outfielder for the Washington Senators; led the American League in stolen bases six times (1939 to 1943 and 1946), and in runs scored (1943); after playing career, head baseball coach of Rutgers University (1950–1960), coach for expansion Senators (1961–1963) and Minnesota Twins (1968), and minor league manager.
January 24 – Earl Jones, 69, relief pitcher for the 1946 St. Louis Browns.
January 28 – Stan Partenheimer, 66, pitcher who played for the Boston Red Sox in 1945 and the St. Louis Cardinals in 1946.

February
February 3 – Dick Bass, 82, pitcher for the 1939 Washington Senators.
February 10 – Dan Kelly, 52, Canadian sportscaster who, though known best as a legendary hockey announcer, spent five seasons (1980 to 1984) on the broadcast team of the St. Louis Cardinals.
February 12 – Euel Moore, 80, pitcher who played from 1934 through 1936 with the Philadelphia Phillies and New York Giants.
February 17 – Lefty Gómez, 80, Hall of Fame pitcher for the New York Yankees from 1930 to 1943, who had four 20-win seasons and a .649 career winning percentage, while leading the American League in strikeouts three times, in wins and ERA twice each, and also posted a 6–0 record with a 2.86 ERA in five World Series.
February 21 – Chet Ross, 70, backup outfielder who hit .241 with 34 home runs and 170 RBI in 413 games for the Boston Bees/Braves from 1939 to 1944.
February 24 – Sparky Adams, 94, middle infielder/third baseman and a .286 career hitter in 1,424 games, who played from 1922 to 1934 for the Chicago Cubs, Pittsburgh Pirates, St. Louis Cardinals and Cincinnati Reds; led the National League second basemen in putouts and assists in the 1925 season.

March
March 3 – Bill Harvey, 80, southpaw pitcher, first baseman and outfielder who played between 1932 and 1946, chiefly for the Pittsburgh/Toledo Crawfords and Baltimore Elite Giants of the Negro National League.
March 8 – Dale Coogan, 58, first baseman who played 53 games for the 1950 Pittsburgh Pirates.
March 13 – Tice James, 74, infielder for four Negro American League teams (1941–1942, 1946).
March 19 – Joe Malay, 83, backup first baseman for the New York Giants in the 1933 and 1935 seasons.
March 21 – Otis Douglas, 77, college and professional American football player who spent the 1961 and 1962 seasons in MLB as conditioning and morale coach for the Cincinnati Reds. 
March 28 – William D. Cox, 79, New York businessman and briefly the owner of the Philadelphia Phillies from March 15 through November 23, 1943, when he was suspended for life by Commissioner Kenesaw Mountain Landis for betting on his own team.
March 28 – Nick Bremigan, 43, American League umpire since 1974  through the time of his death, who officiated in the 1980 World Series, four ALCS, and the All-Star games of 1979 and 1985.

April
April 6 – Carlos Bernier, 62, Puerto Rican outfielder who hit .213 in 105 games for the 1953 Pittsburgh Pirates.
April 8 – Andy Karl, 75, pitcher who posted an 18–23 record and a 3.51 ERA for the Boston Red Sox, Philadelphia Phillies and Boston Braves from 1943 to 1946.
April 8 – Bus Saidt, 68, sportswriter who covered the Philadelphia Phillies, New York Mets and New York Yankees for the Trentonian and the Trenton Times for a long time, which made him a recipient of the J. G. Taylor Spink Award in 1992.
April 9 – Otto Huber, 75, backup infielder for the 1939 Boston Bees.
April 12 – Arnold Carter, 71, pitcher for the Cincinnati Reds from 1944 to 1945, one of many players who only appeared in the majors during World War II, who posted a 13–11 record with a 2.72 ERA in 46 games.
April 14 – Carr Smith, 88, backup outfielder for the Washington Senators from 1923 to 1924.
April 16 – Jocko Conlan, 89, Hall of Fame umpire who worked in the National League from 1941 to 1964, including five World Series and six All-Star Games.
April 19 – Gale Staley, 89, backup second baseman who hit .429 in seven games for the 1925 Chicago Cubs.
April 23 – Howie Krist, 73, pitcher for the St. Louis Cardinals in 128 games over six seasons between 1937 and 1946; member of World Series championship teams in 1942 and 1946; fashioned a 37–11 career record for winning percentage of .771.

May
May 3 – Virgil Stallcup, 67, shortstop for the Cincinnati Reds and the St. Louis Cardinals from 1947 through 1953, who led all National League players at his position in fielding percentage during the 1950 and 1951 seasons.
May 5 – Joe Batchelder, 90, southpaw pitcher who got into 11 games for the Boston Braves between 1923 and 1925.
May 7 – Howie Moss, 69, backup outfielder/third baseman for the New York Giants, Cincinnati Reds and Cleveland Indians in parts of two seasons spanning 1942–1946, also a prodigious slugger in the minor leagues, who is the only player in International League history to lead the circuit in home runs four times, including 53 in 1947, to set a single-season mark not reached since then.
May 13 – Al Reiss, 80, shortstop for the 1932 Philadelphia Athletics.
May 17 – Specs Toporcer, 90, middle infielder and third baseman for the St. Louis Cardinals from 1921 to 1928, who is regarded as the first position player to wear corrective eyeglasses in major league history; later a minor league manager and MLB farm system director.
May 20 – Mike Reinbach, 39, corner outfielder who hit .250 in 12 games for the 1974 Baltimore Orioles.
May 21 – Harry Cozart, 72, pitcher/outfielder in 11 games for Newark Eagles (Negro National League, 1939 and 1944).

June
June 6 – Whitey Glazner, 95, pitcher for the Pittsburgh Pirates and Philadelphia Phillies from 1920 to 1924, who led the National League with a .737 Win–loss % in the 1921 season.
June 8 – Bibb Falk, 90,  sure-handed outfielder who hit a .314 average for the Chicago White Sox and Cleveland Indians, and later coached Texas to two College World Series titles.
June 8 – Glenn McQuillen, 74, reserve outfielder who hit .274 for the St. Louis Browns (1938, 1941–1942, 1946–1947), and later spent 10 years playing and managing in the minor leagues.
June 8 – Emil Verban, 73, three-time All-Star second baseman for four National League teams from 1944 to 1950 and the batting hero of the 1944 World Series with a .412 average, leading the St. Louis Cardinals over the St. Louis Browns in the historic Trolley Series; played all or part of three years (1948–1950) with the Chicago Cubs, "lending" his name to the Emil Verban Memorial Society, a long-standing club for Cubs' fans who live in Washington, D.C.
June 10 – Joe Stripp, 86, fine defensive third baseman and a .294 hitter during 11 seasons with four National League teams from 1928 through 1938.
June 14 – Pat Capri, 70, second baseman and pinch runner in seven games for the 1944 Boston Braves; fanned in his only MLB at bat.
June 15 – Judy Johnson, 89, Negro leagues All-Star third baseman who eventually was able to apply his baseball knowledge in the majors, becoming the first African American to coach in Major League Baseball and one of the most accomplished talent scouts in baseball, being inducted to the Hall of Fame in 1975, as the sixth Negro leaguer honored that way.
June 18 – Steve Senteney, 33, relief pitcher for the 1982 Toronto Blue Jays.
June 23 – Rick Anderson, 35, relief pitcher for the New York Yankees and Seattle Mariners from 1979 to 1980, who in 1979 was named International League Pitcher of the Year, after going 13–3 with a 1.63 ERA and a league-leading 21 saves.

July
July 13 – Vern Olsen, 71, pitcher who posted a 30–26 record and a 3.40 ERA in 112 games for the Chicago Cubs over five seasons spanning 1939–1946.
July 15 – Naomi Meier, 62, fine outfielder for the All-American Girls Professional Baseball League who collected over 25 stolen bases in five of her eight seasons in the league.
July 18 – Donnie Moore, 35, All-Star relief pitcher for five different teams between 1975 and 1988, most prominently with the California Angels, who is best remembered for giving up a pivotal home run in the 1986 ALCS.
July 19 – Joe Greene, 77, three-time All-Star catcher in the Negro American League for the Kansas City Monarchs, for whom he played from 1939 to 1943 and in 1946–1947; U.S. Army combat veteran of World War II.
July 24 – Wally Kimmick, 92, backup infielder who hit .261 in 163 games with the St. Louis Cardinals, Cincinnati Reds and Philadelphia Phillies from 1919 to 1926.

August
August 1 – Don Heffner, 78, who spent two decades in the majors between 1934 and 1969 as a player, coach and manager; notably, skipper of the Cincinnati Reds from Opening Day to July 10, 1966.
August 4 –  Wayne LaMaster, 82, southpaw pitcher who won 19 games for the Philadelphia Phillies and the Brooklyn Dodgers from 1937 to 1938; led National League in games lost (19) in 1937.
August 5 – Max Macon, 73, pitcher, first baseman and outfielder who posted a 17–18 record and hit .265 for the St. Louis Cardinals, Brooklyn Dodgers and Boston Braves in parts of six seasons from 1938 to 1947.
August   8 – Bob Harris, 74, pitcher who won 30 games for the Detroit Tigers, St. Louis Browns and Philadelphia Athletics from 1938 to 1942.
August 10 – Tom Hughes, 82, backup outfielder who hit .373 in 17 games for the 1930 Detroit Tigers.
August 17 – Fred Frankhouse, 85, National League All-Star pitcher for the St. Louis Cardinals, Boston Braves and Brooklyn Dodgers from 1927 to 1939, collecting a 106–97 record and a 3.92 ERA, who outpitched New York Giants ace and future Hall of Famer Carl Hubbell in 1937, snapping Hubbell's historical 24-game winning streak.
August 21 – Ted Wilks, 73, relief pitcher who posted a 59–30 record with a 3.26 ERA and 46 saves for the St. Louis Cardinals, Pittsburgh Pirates and Cleveland Indians from 1944 through 1953.
August 25 – Jim Brideweser, 62, backup shortstop who hit .252 in 329 games for the New York Yankees, Baltimore Orioles, Chicago White Sox and Detroit Tigers from 1951 through 1956.
August 27 – Hal Kelleher, 76, pitcher who posted a 4–9 record with the Philadelphia Phillies in part of four seasons from 1935 to 1938.
August 28 – Fred Waters, 62, relief pitcher who went 2–2 with a 2.89 ERA in 25 games for the 1955–1956 Pittsburgh Pirates; longtime minor-league manager.
August 29 – Buddy Dear, 83, second baseman and pinch-runner who appeared in two games for the 1927 Washington Senators.
August 30 – Buddy Burbage, 82, outfielder whose career in black baseball extended from 1929 to 1943; hit .438 for 1934 Newark Dodgers to capture Negro National League batting title.
August 30 – Joe Collins, 66, first baseman for the New York Yankees from 1950 to 1957 and a member of five world champion teams, who hit four home runs and drove in 10 runs in 36 World Series games.
August 31 – Skeeter Newsome, 78, shortstop for the Philadelphia Athletics, Boston Red Sox and Philadelphia Phillies in 12 seasons from 1935 to 1947; later became a successful minor league manager from 1949 through 1960, with a won–lost record of 806–645 and four championship titles.

September
September 1 – A. Bartlett Giamatti, 51, commissioner of baseball since April 1, known for his banishment of Pete Rose on gambling allegations; previously National League president from June 10, 1986 to March 31, 1989; former Yale University president known for numerous writings on baseball.
September 3 – Rip Sewell, 82, four-time All-Star pitcher credited with inventing the eephus pitch, who posted a 143–97 record and a 3.48 ERA in 390 games for the 1932 Detroit Tigers and the Pittsburgh Pirates from 1938 through 1949, while leading the National League pitchers with 21 wins in 1943 and a .833 winning percentage in 1948.
September 4 – Hal Lee, 84, outfielder for the Brooklyn Robins, Philadelphia Phillies and Boston Braves from 1930 to 1936, who replaced Babe Ruth in Braves left field in what turned out to be Ruth's last game on May 30, .
September 17 – Leon Culberson, 71, outfielder for the Washington Senators and Boston Red Sox from 1943 to 1948, who led American League center fielders with 13 assists and six double plays in 1945, while collecting a .313 average in 1946 to help the Red Sox win its first American League pennant in 28 years.
September 21 – Murry Dickson, 73, All-Star pitcher who spent 18 major league seasons with six teams from 1939 to 1959, being part of the 1946 St. Louis Cardinals and 1958 New York Yankees World Series champions as well as for last-place teams for most of his career, winning 20 games for the 1951 Pittsburgh Pirates and collecting two 20-loss seasons, while posting a 172–181 record and a 3.66 ERA in 625 pitching appearances.
September 29 – August A. Busch Jr., 90, owner of the St. Louis Cardinals since 1953 who oversaw three World Series titles.
September 30 – Roy Weir, 78, pitcher who posted a 6–4 record for the Boston Bees/Braves from 1936 to 1939.

October
October 11 – Bill Phebus, 80, pitcher who posted a 3–2 record and a 3.31 ERA in 13 games for the Washington Senators from 1936 through 1938.
October 12 – Joe Foy, 46, third baseman for the Boston Red Sox, Kansas City Royals, New York Mets and Washington Senators from 1966 to 1971, who also won the International League batting title, MVP award and Rookie of the Year during the 1965 season.
October 15 – Lou Guisto, 94, backup first baseman who hit .196 in 156 games for the Cleveland Indians in five seasons from 1916 to 1923.
October 17 – John Mackinson, 65, pitcher who played briefly for the 1953 Philadelphia Athletics and the 1955 St. Louis Cardinals.
October 24 – Ollie O'Mara, 98, shortstop/third baseman for the Detroit Tigers and the Brooklyn Robins in parts of six seasons spanning 1912–1919, and also a member of the Brooklyn National League champion team that faced the Boston Red Sox in the 1916 World Series.
October 30 – Sug Cornelius, 83, pitcher who hurled in black baseball between 1929 and 1946, chiefly for Chicago American Giants; in 1938, led Negro American League in wins (going 9–1), complete games (8) and saves (3).

November
November 1 – Elise Harney, 64, All-American Girls Professional Baseball League All-Star pitcher and one of the sixty founding members of the circuit in 1943.
November 2 – Steve Simpson, 41, relief pitcher who posted a 0–2 record in nine games for the 1972 San Diego Padres.
November 4 – Pancho Coimbre, 80, native of Puerto Rico and two-time Negro National League All-Star outfielder who batted .337 lifetime for the New York Cubans (1940–1941, 1943–1944).
November 7 – Tommy Tatum, 70, center fielder for the Brooklyn Dodgers and Cincinnati Reds in two seasons spanning 1941–1947, who served in World War II and later managed in the minor leagues.
November 8 – Johnny Lanning, 79, pitcher who posted a 58–60 record and a 3.58 ERA in 278 games for the Boston Bees/Braves and Pittsburgh Pirates in a span of 11 seasons from 1936 to 1947.
November 9 – Clemente Carreras, 75, Havana-born infielder for the 1940–1941 New York Cubans of the Negro National League; managed in the Mexican League for five seasons between 1962 and 1976.
November 15 – Rocky Ellis, 78, pitcher and occasional outfielder for the Philadelphia Stars (1934–1940) and Homestead Grays (1940) of the Negro National League.
November 17 – Jack Cusick, 61, shortstop for the Chicago Cubs and Boston Braves from 1951 through 1952.
November 20 – Dolan Nichols, 59, relief pitcher for the 1958 Chicago Cubs, who had one career save and surrendered only one home run in 41.0 innings.
November 26 – Lew Fonseca, 90, valuable and versatile fielder as well as a solid hitter, who played from 1921 through 1933 for the Cincinnati Reds, Philadelphia Phillies, Cleveland Indians and Chicago White Sox, topping the .300 mark six times and winning the American League batting crown with a .369 average in 1929; manager of White Sox from 1932 to May 8, 1934; his long-term contribution to baseball was pioneering the use of film to analyze and promote the game.
November 27 – Ray Boggs, 84, relief pitcher who appeared in four games for the 1928 Boston Braves.
November 28 – "Barnacle Bill" Posedel, 83, pitcher for the Brooklyn Dodgers and Boston Braves between 1938 and 1946 who posted a 41–43 mark; served in U.S. Navy before his baseball career and during World War II; later pitching coach for six big-league clubs between 1949 and 1974 who was instrumental in developing stellar Oakland Athletics' mound staff; coach for 1972 World Series champions.

December
December 4 – Steve Lembo, 63, backup catcher for the Brooklyn Dodgers during the 1950 and 1952 seasons.
December 6 – Art Parks, 78, outfielder who hit .275 in 78 games for the Brooklyn Dodgers in the 1937 and 1939 seasons.
December 17 – Zeb Eaton, 69, relief pitcher for the Detroit Tigers from 1944 to 1945, and also a member of the Tigers 1945 World Champions.
December 21 – Ralph Schwamb, 63, pitcher for the 1948 St. Louis Browns, who later became the first major league player to ever be convicted of murder and sentenced to life in prison.
December 22 – Archie Campbell, 86, relief pitcher who posted a 2–6 record with a 4.50 ERA and six saves for three teams from 1928 to 1930, being also a member of the Yankees 1928 World Champions.
December 25 – Billy Martin, 61, All-Star second baseman for the New York Yankees and 1953 World Series MVP Award winner; known for his tempestuous behavior off the field, he later managed Yankees on five different occasions between 1975 and 1988, leading the team to the 1976 AL pennant and the 1977 World Series title; also guided the 1969 Minnesota Twins, 1972 Detroit Tigers and 1981 Oakland Athletics to playoff appearances, and received four Manager of the Year awards.
December 26 – Roy Joiner, 83, pitcher for the Chicago Cubs from 1934 to 1935 and the New York Giants in 1940, who pitched another 15 minor league seasons and also served during World War II.

References

External links

Major League Baseball official website 
Minor League Baseball official website 
Baseball Almanac – Major League Baseball Players Who Died in 1989